Shahverdi (also Romanized as Shāhverdī; also known as Qeshlāq, Qeshlāq-e Shāhverdī, Qeshlāq-e Shāverdī, Qishlāq, and Shāverdī) is a village in Qeshlaq Rural District, in the Central District of Ahar County, East Azerbaijan Province, Iran. At the 2006 census, its population was 544, in 119 families.

References 

Populated places in Ahar County